Robert Bruce Mathias (November 17, 1930 – September 2, 2006) was an American decathlete, two-time Olympic gold medalist in the event, a United States Marine Corps officer, actor and United States Congressman representing the state of California for four terms from 1967 to 1975.

Early life and athletic career
Mathias was born in Tulare, California to a family with partial Greek lineage.  He attended Tulare Union High School, where he was a classmate and long time friend of Sim Iness, the 1952 Olympic discus gold medalist. While at Tulare Union in early 1948, Mathias took up the decathlon at the suggestion of his track coach, Virgil Jackson. During the summer following his high school graduation, he qualified for the United States Olympic team for the 1948 Summer Olympics held in London.

In the Olympics, Mathias's naïveté about the decathlon was exposed. He was unaware of the rules in the shot put and nearly fouled out of the event. He almost failed in the high jump but was able to recover. Mathias overcame his difficulties and with superior pole vault and javelin scores was able to push past Ignace Heinrich to win the Olympic gold medal. At age 17, he became the youngest gold medalist in a track and field event.

Mathias continued to succeed in decathlons in the four years between the London games and the 1952 Summer Olympics in Helsinki. In 1948, Mathias won the James E. Sullivan Award as the nation's top amateur athlete, but because his scholastic record in high school did not match his athletic achievement, he spent a year at The Kiski School, a well-respected all-boys boarding school in Saltsburg, Pennsylvania. He then entered Stanford University in 1949, played college football for two years and was a member of Phi Gamma Delta fraternity. Mathias set his first decathlon world record in 1950 and led Stanford to a Rose Bowl appearance in 1952, the first nationally televised college football game.

After graduating from Stanford in 1953 with a BA in Education, Mathias spent two and a half years in the U.S. Marine Corps. He was promoted to the rank of captain and was honorably discharged.

At Helsinki in 1952, Mathias established himself as one of the world's greatest all-around athletes. He won the decathlon by the astounding margin of 912 points, which established a new world record, and he became the first person to successfully defend an Olympic decathlon title. He returned to the United States as a national hero. His 7,887 point total at the Helsinki Olympics remained the school record at Stanford for 63 years until it was broken in 2015 by a freshman, Harrison Williams. In 1952, he was the first person to compete in an Olympics and a Rose Bowl the same year.

After the 1952 Olympics, Mathias retired from athletic competition. He later became the first director of the United States Olympic Training Center, a post he held from 1977 to 1983.

He and his wife Melba can be seen on the edition of April 29, 1954 of You Bet Your Life.  During the discussion he mentions a forthcoming film in which the couple played themselves, called The Bob Mathias Story. He also starred in a number of mostly cameo-type roles in a variety of movies and TV shows throughout the 1950s. In the 1959–1960 television season, Mathias played Frank Dugan, with costars Keenan Wynn as Kodiak and Chet Allen as Slats, in the TV series The Troubleshooters, which featured 26 episodes on events at construction sites. In 1960, he also appeared as an athletic Theseus in an Italian "peplum," or sword-and-sandal, film: Minotaur, the Wild Beast of Crete.

Political career
Between 1967 and 1975, Mathias served four terms in the United States House of Representatives as a Republican, representing the northern San Joaquin Valley of California. (These were the same eight years in which Ronald Reagan served two terms as governor of California.) He defeated Harlan Hagen, the 14-year Democratic Party incumbent, by about 11% in the 1966 election. This was not too surprising because this area started to move away from its New Deal Democratic roots.

Mathias was re-elected three times without serious difficulty, but in 1974, his Congressional district was significantly redrawn in a mid-decade state redistricting plan. Renumbered as the 17th, Mathias' district acquired a large section of Fresno while losing several rural areas. Mathias was narrowly defeated for re-election by John Hans Krebs, a member of the Fresno County Board of Supervisors. Mathias was one of several Republicans swept out of office in the wake of the Watergate scandal.

From June to August 1975, Mathias served as the deputy director of the Selective Service. Mathias was also a regional director in the unsuccessful 1976 presidential election campaign of Gerald Ford.

Death
Bob Mathias was diagnosed with cancer in 1996, and died from it in Fresno, California on September 2, 2006 at age 75. He is interred at Tulare Cemetery in Tulare, California. He was survived by wife Gwen, daughters Romel, Megan, Marissa, stepdaughter Alyse Alexander, son Reiner, brothers Eugene and Jim, and sister Patricia Guerrero.

Timeline

Filmography

References

External links

 
 DVD with Bob Mathias' Last Interview
 Boy-wonder Mathias elevated decathlon ESPN.com, 2005.
 Former congressman Bob Mathias dies at 75, USA Today retrieved September 5, 2007
 
 
 
 
 
 
 

|-

|-

1930 births
2006 deaths
20th-century American politicians
American actor-politicians
American athlete-politicians
American male decathletes
American male television actors
Athletes (track and field) at the 1948 Summer Olympics
Athletes (track and field) at the 1952 Summer Olympics
Deaths from cancer in California
World record setters in athletics (track and field)
James E. Sullivan Award recipients
Medalists at the 1948 Summer Olympics
Medalists at the 1952 Summer Olympics
Olympic gold medalists for the United States in track and field
People from Tulare, California
Republican Party members of the United States House of Representatives from California
Sportspeople from Tulare County, California
Stanford Cardinal football players
Stanford Cardinal men's track and field athletes
Track and field athletes from California
United States Marine Corps officers
20th-century American male actors
The Kiski School alumni
Military personnel from California